Muslims in North Macedonia represent just under one-third of the nation's total population according to the 2021 census, making Islam the second most widely professed religion in the country. Muslims in North Macedonia follow Sunni Islam of the Hanafi madhhab. Some northwestern and western regions of the country have Muslim majorities. A large majority of all the Muslims in the country are ethnic Albanians, with the rest being primarily Turks, Romani, Bosniaks or Torbeš.

Population

Ethnicity

Historical population
The following table shows the Muslim population and percentage for each given year. The Muslim percentage in Macedonia generally decreased from 1904 to 1961 but began to rise again due to high fertility rate among Muslim families, reaching 33.33% in 2002. According to the census of 2021, the share of Muslims was 32.17% of the total (resident) population, which was slightly lower compared to 33.33% in the census of 2002.

Geographic distribution
(according to the 2021 census)

The Ss. Cyril and Methodius University of Skopje stated in 2012 that "religion is primary importance to Macedonia's Muslims." The university conducted a survey of 1.850 Muslims in North Macedonia, which found that 81.6% described themselves as religious, 60.5% of which were very religious. Approximately 22% never went to a mosque(48,6% attend mosque at least once a week) and 17.3% did not pray at home(42,1% pray five times a day). About 28,6% believed that disputes should be resolved using Islamic Sharia law(41,7% say that should be resolved using North Macedonia's laws,29,7% didn't know or refused to answer),  and 27,8% said that wearing a veil in school was "unacceptable." 16,4% of the respondents said cohabitation without marriage was "acceptable"(74,2% said " non  acceptable" and 9,3% refused to answer), 13,6% ate pork and 24,8% drank alcohol. Also 94% of respondents said they circumcised their boys and 98% observed Muslim burial practices for their relatives.

According to a 2017 Pew Research Center survey, 64% of Macedonian Muslims responded that religion is "very important" in their lives. The same survey found that 43% of Macedonian Muslims pray all five salah, 51% attend mosque at least once a week, and 46% read Quran at least once a week.That makes Macedonian Muslims the most religious Muslim community between the Balkan countries with the Muslim communities in Montenegro and Serbia.

Gallery

See also
 Demographics of North Macedonia
 Religion in North Macedonia
 Rumelia
 Albanians in North Macedonia
 Macedonian Muslims
 Turks in North Macedonia
 Romani in North Macedonia
 Bosniaks in North Macedonia

References

 
Macedonia, Republic of